"I Threw Away the Rose" is a song written and recorded by American country music artist Merle Haggard and The Strangers.  It was released in February 1967 as the first single from the album Branded Man.  The song peaked at number two on the U.S. Billboard Hot Country Singles. In 1994 Lorrie Morgan recorded a version of the song which replaced the "I" in the lyrics with "you", changing it from a self-referential song to a song about someone else, for the Merle Haggard tribute album Mama's Hungry Eyes: A Tribute to Merle Haggard.

Personnel
Merle Haggard– vocals, guitar

The Strangers:
Roy Nichols – guitar
Ralph Mooney – steel guitar
George French – piano
Jerry Ward – bass
Eddie Burris – drums

Chart performance

References

1967 singles
Merle Haggard songs
Lorrie Morgan songs
Songs written by Merle Haggard
Song recordings produced by Ken Nelson (American record producer)
Capitol Records singles
1967 songs